Charles Jervis Gilman (February 26, 1824 – February 5, 1901) was a U.S. Representative from Maine, grandnephew of John Taylor Gilman and Nicholas Gilman.

Born in Exeter, New Hampshire, Gilman attended Phillips Exeter Academy, Exeter, New Hampshire, and pursued classical studies. He was graduated from Harvard Law School. He was admitted to the bar in 1850 and commenced practice in Exeter, New Hampshire. He served as member of the New Hampshire House of Representatives in 1851 and 1852. He moved to Brunswick, Maine and married Alice McKeen Dunlap, and continued the practice of law. He lived in the John Dunlap House, also known as the Gilman Mansion. He served as member of the Maine House of Representatives in 1854 and 1855. He served as member of the State Whig committee.

Gilman was elected as a Republican to the Thirty-fifth Congress (March 4, 1857 – March 3, 1859). He declined to be a candidate for renomination in 1858. He served as delegate to the Republican National Convention in 1860. He was interested in introducing waterworks and other public improvements. He died in Brunswick, Maine, on February 5, 1901. He was interred in Pine Grove Cemetery.

References

1824 births
1901 deaths
Gilman family of New Hampshire
Phillips Exeter Academy alumni
Harvard Law School alumni
Members of the Maine House of Representatives
Members of the New Hampshire House of Representatives
Politicians from Brunswick, Maine
People from Exeter, New Hampshire
Maine Whigs
Republican Party members of the United States House of Representatives from Maine
19th-century American politicians